Michael Anthony O'Brien (born 5 August 1971) is an Australian politician. He has been a Liberal Party member of the Victorian Legislative Assembly since 2006, representing the electorate of Malvern and served as the leader of the party and opposition leader from December 2018 to September 2021.

O'Brien served as Minister for Gaming, Minister for Consumer Affairs and Minister for Energy and Resources in the Baillieu government from 2010 to 2013, and was promoted to Treasurer in the 2013–2014 Napthine government. Following the defeat of the Napthine government at the 2014 state election, O'Brien contested the leadership of the Liberal Party, but was defeated by Matthew Guy. Guy resigned the party leadership following the party's defeat at the 2018 state election. Subsequently, on 6 December 2018, O'Brien was elected leader of the Liberal Party and became opposition leader. On 7 September 2021, Guy successfully challenged O'Brien for the party leadership, and returned to the role of opposition leader.

Education

O'Brien underwent secondary education at Marcellin College before completing a Bachelor of Laws (Honours) and a Bachelor of Commerce from the University of Melbourne. He worked as a barrister at the Victorian Bar practising in the fields of trade practices and commercial law. With co-author Jamie Richardson, O'Brien won the Law Institute of Victoria's Rogers Legal Writing Award in 2006. While at the Bar he also lectured part-time in trade practices at the Leo Cussen Institute of Continuing Legal Education and performed pro bono work.

Political career

O'Brien served as a senior adviser to the former Federal Treasurer Peter Costello for five years.

He stood for the Liberal Party in the blue-ribbon seat of Malvern at the 2006 state election, winning with over 60 per cent of second-preference votes.

On 6 December 2006, he was appointed to the Shadow Cabinet by the State Opposition leader, Ted Baillieu, to the position of Shadow Minister for Gaming. He was one of three newly elected Liberal MPs who were immediately promoted to Shadow Cabinet following the 2006 election, the others being Mary Wooldridge and Matthew Guy.

In August 2007, he was promoted to Shadow Minister for Consumer Affairs—taking over from Wendy Lovell—in addition to his responsibilities for gaming. In April 2009, he called for the Brumby Government to change company share laws so that apartment owners could take consumer cases to the Victorian Civil and Administrative Tribunal, instead of having to go the Supreme Court.

In November 2009, O'Brien was promoted in a shadow cabinet reshuffle. He had been tipped to gain a "senior portfolio" but ended up in charge of three separate economic portfolios: infrastructure and public-private partnerships; energy and resources; and exports and trade. He told a local newspaper that he was "delighted with the changes" and was looking forward to "developing a better alternative to Labor's poor performance [in energy security and improved infrastructure]". He retained the gaming and consumer affairs portfolios.

Following the election of the Victorian Liberal Nationals Coalition at the 2010 state election, O'Brien was sworn in on 2 December 2010 as Minister for Energy and Resources, Minister for Gaming and Minister for Consumer Affairs.

In 2011 the Victorian Government proposed changing the Gaming Regulation Act to make it an offence to insult the Minister. The Opposition responded by calling him "Windscreens O'Brien – because this proves he's got a glass jaw".

After the move of Liberal MP Geoff Shaw to the crossbenches and the resignation of Premier Ted Baillieu in March 2013, O'Brien became Treasurer of Victoria in the ministry of the Napthine minority government.

Matthew Guy was elected as leader of the Liberal Party in a leadership ballot contested on 4 December 2014, making him Leader of the Opposition after defeating Michael O'Brien for the position. Matthew Guy made O'Brien shadow treasurer in opposition.

On 6 December 2018, O'Brien was elected the leader of the Liberal party after Guy resigned following the 2018 state election defeat.
O'Brien's Chief of Staff Brett Hogan resigned from the position in 2021.

In an Ipsos poll commissioned by The Age and Nine News in October 2020, only 15% of respondents approved of O'Brien's performance during the COVID-19 pandemic and 39% disapproved of his performance, with O'Brien trailing Daniel Andrews as preferred premier by 53% to 18%; among Coalition supporters, only 27% approved of his performance. Despite this negative polling, O'Brien stated that he was confident of remaining leader of the Victorian Liberals in 2022.

On 7 September 2021, O'Brien was replaced by Guy as party leader and opposition leader in a leadership spill. Initially, he declined to be in Guy's shadow cabinet, but in February 2022, he was appointed as shadow attorney-general.

O’Brien was re-elected in 2022.

Personal life 
Michael O'Brien lives in his Malvern electorate with his wife and two children.

O'Brien is a supporter of the Carlton Football Club in the Australian Football League, a very keen golfer, and is a co-founder of the Spring Street Blues, a Victorian MP supporter group for Carlton.

See also 
 Shadow Ministry of Michael O'Brien

Notes

References
Bibliography

News articles

Online resources

External links
Liberal Party profile
Parliamentary Handbook profile

1971 births
Living people
Leaders of the Opposition in Victoria (Australia)
Members of the Victorian Legislative Assembly
Treasurers of Victoria 
Liberal Party of Australia members of the Parliament of Victoria
Australian barristers
Irish emigrants to Australia
21st-century Australian politicians
People educated at Marcellin College, Bulleen